The 2018–19 Israeli Premier League, also known as Ligat Japanika for sponsorship reasons, was the twentieth season since its introduction in 1999 and the 77th season of top-tier football in Israel. The season began on 25 August 2018 and concluded on 25 May 2019. Hapoel Be'er Sheva were the defending champions.

Teams
A total of fourteen teams were competing in the league, including twelve sides from the 2017–18 season and two promoted teams from the 2017–18 Liga Leumit.

Hapoel Akko and Hapoel Ashkelon were relegated to the 2018–19 Liga Leumit after finishing the 2017–18 Israeli Premier League in the bottom two places.

Hapoel Tel Aviv were promoted as the winners of the 2017–18 Liga Leumit. This ends the team's one-year absence from the top division.

Hapoel Hadera were promoted as the Runner-ups of the 2017–18 Liga Leumit. This marked the return of Hadera to the top division after 39 years of absence.

Stadiums and locations

Personnel and sponsorship

Foreign players
The number of foreign players were restricted to six per team, while only five could have been registered to a game.

In bold: Players that have been capped for their national team.

Managerial changes

Regular season

Regular season table

Regular season results

Source:

Positions by round

Championship round
Key numbers for pairing determination (number marks position after 26 games)

Due to 3 teams that play in the Netanya stadium qualifying to this round, and in order to insure that all the last games of this round, can be played in the same time(for purity reasons), the order of the games, has been changed. Affecting fixtures 33,35 and 36.

Championship round table

Championship round results

Positions by round

Relegation round
Key numbers for pairing determination (number marks position after 26 games)

Relegation round table

Relegation round results

Positions by round

Season statistics

Top scorers

Source: (Hebrew)

Hat-tricks

Top assists

Source: (Hebrew)

See also
2018–19 Liga Leumit
2018-19 Ligat Nashim

References

External links
 uefa.com

Israeli Premier League seasons
1
Israel